Statistics of Soviet Top League for the 1981 season.

Overview
It was contested by 18 teams, and Dynamo Kyiv won the championship.

League standings

Results

Top scorers
23 goals
 Ramaz Shengelia (Dinamo Tbilisi)

21 goals
 Yuri Gavrilov (Spartak Moscow)

19 goals
 Oleg Blokhin (Dynamo Kyiv)

16 goals
 Vladimir Kazachyonok (Zenit)

15 goals
 Valery Gazzaev (Dynamo Moscow)

14 goals
 Khoren Hovhannisyan (Ararat)
 Pyotr Vasilevsky (Dinamo Minsk)

13 goals
 Andrei Yakubik (Pakhtakor)

12 goals
 Viktor Grachyov (Shakhtar)
 Aleksandr Pogorelov (Dnipro)

References
Soviet Union - List of final tables (RSSSF)
1981. Higher League. (1981. Высшая лига.) Luhansk Our Futbol portal.
44th USSR Championship, 1981 Higher League (44-й чемпионат СССР, 1981г. Высшая лига). Wildstat website.

Soviet Top League seasons
1
Soviet
Soviet